Napoleon Paul Barrel (December 25, 1885December 1, 1964) was a professional football player.  He played seven games in the National Football League during the 1923 season, at age 37, with the Oorang Indians. The Indians were a team based in LaRue, Ohio, composed only of Native Americans, and coached by Jim Thorpe. Barrel was a member of the Chippewas.

References

Uniform Numbers of the NFL

Notes

1885 births
Players of American football from Minnesota
Native American players of American football
Carlisle Indians football players
Oorang Indians players
1964 deaths
People from Becker County, Minnesota